I Spy With My Little Eye... is a 2011 Children's picture book by Edward Gibbs. It is based on the I spy game with the reader being given written and visual clues about an animal on the initial double page and the answer with a picture of the animal on the following double page.

Reception
A review by Booktrust wrote "The guessing game itself is great fun, but it's the bold, elegant illustrations and ingenious design which set this book apart, making it a more complex experience for young readers."

I Spy With My Little Eye has also been reviewed by Kirkus Reviews (star review), Publishers Weekly (star review), The Horn Book Magazine, School Library Journal, and ForeWard Reviews,

It was a 2012 Missouri Building Block Picture Book Award nominee.

References

External links

Library holdings of I Spy With My Little Eye

2011 children's books
British picture books